New Harvest...First Gathering is the eighteenth solo studio album by American entertainer Dolly Parton. It was released on February 14, 1977, by RCA Victor. It is significant for being Parton's first self-produced album, as well as her first effort aimed specifically at the pop charts.

Content
In addition to her own compositions, Parton included The Temptations classic "My Girl" (sung as the gender-neutral "My Love"), and "(Your Love Has Lifted Me) Higher and Higher", originally a Jackie Wilson hit. "Applejack" features an all-star lineup of country legends singing background vocals, including Roy Acuff, Kitty Wells, Johnny Wright, Chet Atkins and Minnie Pearl.

Critical reception

In the issue dated February 26, 1977, Billboard published a review calling the album "Parton's most progressive and individualistic LP ever. Changes in producer (Gregg Perry co-produces this with Dolly), studio, publisher and mental outlook are bound to have a significant effect on the ultimate product. The changes are dramatic and result in some of the most memorable work yet – in writing and singing – by Parton. She wrote most of the songs and vividly displays her stunning powers as a writer. This could be the album that shoves Parton from a country-only base to the category of across-the-board talents like Emmylou Harris and Linda Ronstadt who emulate and admire her."

Cashbox published a review in the February 26, 1977 issue, which said, "Breaking from her country roots, Dolly has put together this package of tailor-mades for the progressive rock listener. Her versatility and natural talents combined with her excellent production as well as arrangement comes crystal clear here."

Commercial performance
The album peaked at No. 1 on the US Billboard Hot Country LPs chart and No. 71 on the US Billboard 200 chart.

"You Are" was released as the first single from the album in March 1977 in Europe, but did not chart. However, in 1983 it reached the number 1 position in Dutch charts.

The first single in North America, "Light of a Clear Blue Morning" was released in March 1977 and peaked at number 11 on the Billboard Hot Country Singles chart. It peaked at number one on the RPM Top County Singles chart.

"Applejack" had been issued as the B-side of "You Are" in Europe and would be re-promoted as the A-side later in 1977 and did not chart.

"(Your Love Has Lifted Me) Higher and Higher" was released as a single in Germany, but did not chart; it was not released as a single in the US, due, in part, to Rita Coolidge's cover of the song, which had reached the US top ten earlier in 1977.

Track listing

Personnel
Adapted from the album liner notes.

Roy Acuff – backing vocals
Rich Adler – engineer
Chet Atkins – backing vocals
Anita Ball – backing vocals
Bashful Brother Oswald – backing vocals
Stu Basore – steel
Lea Jane Berinati – background vocals
Clyde Brooks – drums, percussion, tambourine, backing vocals
Mark Casstevens – banjo
Charlie Chappelear – bass, backing vocals
Ralph Childs – tuba
Jimmy Colvard – acoustic guitars, electric guitar
Jimmy Crawford – steel, backing vocals
Richard Dennison – backing vocals
Bobby Dyson – bass
Bob Ferguson – Applejack's voice
Mary Fielder – backing vocals
Janie Fricke – backing vocals
Hubert Gregory and the Fruit Jar Drinkers – backing vocals
Joe and Rose Lee Maphis – backing vocals
Shane Keister – organ synthesizer, organ
The Kelly Kirkland Strings – string
Dave Kirby – acoustic guitars
Jerry Kroon – drums, percussion
Larrie Londin – drums
Brent Maher – engineer
Kirk McGee – backing vocals
Joe McGuffee – dobro, steel
Terry McMillan – harmonica
Farrell Morris – percussion
The Nashville Horns – horns
Jamie Nichol – conga
Avie Lee Parton – backing vocals
Dolly Parton – producer, lead vocals, backing vocals, banjo
Lee Parton – backing vocals
Randy Parton – backing vocals
Minnie Pearl – backing vocals
John Pell – acoustic guitar, classical guitar, backing vocals
Gregg Perry – producer, piano, tambourine, keyboards, backing vocals, string arrangements, string conductor
Debbie Joe Puckett – backing vocals
Dwight Puckett – backing vocals
Billy Puett – flute, piccolo, horns
Jimmy Riddle – Jew's (juice) harp
Don Roth – electric guitars
Tom Rutledge – acoustic guitars
Rod Smarr – electric guitar, acoustic guitars, slide guitar, backing vocals
Buddy Spicher – fiddle
Bobby Thompson – banjo, acoustic guitars
Ernest Tubb – backing vocals
Ray Walker – backing vocals
Don Warden – backing vocals
Kitty Wells – backing vocals
The Willis Brothers – backing vocals
Wilma Lee and Stoney Cooper – backing vocals
Casey Worden – backing vocals
Kelly Worden – backing vocals
Mickie Worden – backing vocals
Johnny Wright – backing vocals

Chart positions
Album

Singles

Accolades
20th Annual Grammy Awards

|-
| 1978
| "(Your Love Has Lifted Me) Higher and Higher"
| Best Country Vocal Performance, Female
|
|-

References 

Dolly Parton albums
1977 albums
RCA Records albums